Torr is an English surname. Notable people named Torr include

A. C. Torr, punning pseudonym of actor Frederick Hobson Leslie (1866–1892)
Cecil Torr (1857–1928), English antiquarian and author
Jane Torr, Australian academic
Michèle Torr (born Michelle Cléberte Tort in 1947), French singer and author
William George Torr (1853–1939), teacher and religious educator in South Australia

See also
 Torr (disambiguation)